
Grand Pacific Glacier is a   long glacier in British Columbia and Alaska.

National Park Service Information
Much of the ice margin was then grounded at low tide; the calving section probably reached a water depth of only . This latter estimate was based on measurements of aerial photographs taken between 1988 and 1990 and may be
higher than 2004 rates based on the fact that the ice had been thinning over the last 7 years or so. The eastern portion of Grand
In 2004 those glaciers were no longer together due to recession of the Grand Pacific margin. A small stream flowed between the two termini. In about 1996, an embayment began to form in the center of Grand Pacific's terminus. Since then, the center of the ice cliff began to calve more rapidly and was slowly receding at perhaps  or less per year. In 2004 the CRREL anticipated that retreat would accelerate as the embayment enlarged and the depth at the waterline increased. In such a scenario, retreat was likely to continue until the terminus reaches a position where it will become grounded above mean tide. The grounded western edge of the glacier was also slowing receding and thinning. Rock debris from landslides and medial moraines cover much of this side of the glacier and extends across almost two-thirds of the ice face. Where this rock debris is more than an inch thick, it insulates the ice, slows melting and results in a thicker ice mass than where the ice is clean.

See also
 List of glaciers
 Glacier Bay Basin
 Tatshenshini–Alsek Provincial Park

References 

Glaciers of Alaska
Glaciers of Hoonah–Angoon Census Area, Alaska
Glaciers of British Columbia
Glaciers of Yakutat City and Borough, Alaska
Glaciers of Unorganized Borough, Alaska
Cassiar Land District